The Buddha is the popular name of Siddhartha Gautama, founder of Buddhism.

Buddha also refers to a title in Buddhism for those who have achieved Buddhahood.

Other uses include:

Arts and entertainment
 Buddha (album), by Blink-182, 1994
 Buddha (manga), by Osamu Tezuka, 1972–1983
 A Buddha, a 2005 Argentine film 
 Buddha (2007 film) or Gautama Buddha, an Indian film 
 The Buddha (2010 film), an American television documentary film
 Buddha (TV series), a 2013 Indian historical drama series

Other uses
 Buddha Air, a Nepalese airline
 Buddha, Indiana, an unincorporated community in the United States

See also
 Buddha Temple, a summit in the Grand Canyon
 Buddah Records, an American record label
 Buda (disambiguation), other uses of the term Buda
 Buda, western part of the Hungarian capital Budapest
 Budda (disambiguation)
 Budha, a Sanskrit word that connotes the planet Mercury
 Budai, a Chinese monk venerated as Maitreya Buddha and often confused with Gautama Buddha
 Lists of Buddhas